The Best FIFA Football Awards is a football award presented annually by the sport's governing body, FIFA.

The first awarding ceremony was held on 9 January 2017 in Zürich, Switzerland. The award is aimed at reviving the FIFA World Player Gala.

Men's awards

The Best FIFA Men's Player

The Best FIFA Men's Goalkeeper

The Best FIFA Men's Coach

FIFA FIFPRO Men's World 11

Women's awards

The Best FIFA Women's Player

The Best FIFA Women's Goalkeeper

The Best FIFA Women's Coach

FIFA FIFPRO Women's World 11

Mixed awards

FIFA Fair Play Award

FIFA Puskás Award

FIFA Fan Award

FIFA Special Award for an Outstanding Career Achievement

Awards by year
 The Best FIFA Football Awards 2016
 The Best FIFA Football Awards 2017
 The Best FIFA Football Awards 2018
 The Best FIFA Football Awards 2019
 The Best FIFA Football Awards 2020
 The Best FIFA Football Awards 2021
 The Best FIFA Football Awards 2022

Awards by name
 The Best FIFA Men's Player
 The Best FIFA Women's Player
 The Best FIFA Men's Coach
 The Best FIFA Women's Coach
 The Best FIFA Men's Goalkeeper
 The Best FIFA Women's Goalkeeper
 The FIFA Puskás Award
 The FIFA Fair Play Award
 The FIFA Fan Award
 FIFA FIFPRO Men's World 11
 FIFA FIFPRO Women's World 11

See also
Ballon d'Or
FIFA Ballon d'Or
FIFA World Player of the Year
FIFA World Player Gala

References

External links
 
 {{unofficial website|https://www.allinfo1.com/2023/03/FIFA%20Football%20Awards.html/the-best-fifa-football-awards}

 
FIFA trophies and awards
Awards established in 2016
Association football player of the year awards